A gold frame is an attachment to a military decoration which is issued by the militaries of some countries. The gold frame is designed to enclose an award ribbon and is usually a means of distinguishing the ribbon's special quality or denoting some additional achievement to the award's basic criteria.

The gold frame is normally an automatic attachment to a ribbon decoration.  In certain cases, however, awards may be issued both with and without the gold frame depending upon the level of achievement.  Such is the case in the United States Air Force which denotes the gold frame as a "gold border". The Air Force Expeditionary Service Ribbon may be presented with a gold border when the decoration is presented for service in a designated combat zone.

The gold frame and gold border is a device for ribbon awards only, and there are no provisions for issuing the attachment for medals.

United States

Active duty

National Guard and State Guard Forces

Australia

Vietnam

Other countries

See also
 Awards and decorations of the United States military
 Awards and decorations of the National Guard
 Authorized foreign decorations of the United States military

Notes

Devices and accouterments of United States military awards
Military awards and decorations of the United States
Ribbon symbolism